Brian Victor Katz (born November 15, 1957) is the former head men's basketball coach at Sacramento State. He graduated from Casa Roble High School, then Sacramento State in 1980. Katz came to Sacramento State after 19 years as a junior college head coach.

Katz was named Big Sky Conference Co-Coach of the year in 2015. He retired just prior to the start of the 2021-22 season due to a health issue. Associate head coach Brandon Laird became the interim coach.

Head coaching record
The following table summarizes Katz's record as an NCAA head coach.

References

1957 births
Living people
American men's basketball coaches
American men's basketball players
Basketball coaches from California
Basketball players from Sacramento, California
California State University, Sacramento alumni
High school basketball coaches in the United States
Junior college men's basketball coaches in the United States
Sacramento State Hornets men's basketball coaches
Santa Clara Broncos men's basketball coaches